Évasion FM (styled EVASION), is a French private regional radio station created in 1983 owned by the HPI Groupe and based at Évry, in Paris. The station mainly broadcasts in the Parisian suburbs, and broadcasts mostly music and regional news.

Broadcasting area
Évasion FM has currently 20 frequencies throughout 8 departments. Additionally, Évasion FM is also available on several websites on the Internet such as the official website.

Essonne
 Dourdan : 92.5 MHz
 Évry : 99.3 MHz

Eure
 Bernay : 101.7 MHz

Eure-et-Loir
 Dreux : 99.2 MHz

Oise
 Beauvais : 89.7 MHz
 Clermont : 102.1 MHz
 Creil : 99.7 MHz
 Formerie : 93.3 MHz

Seine-et-Marne
 Fontainebleau : 88.8 MHz
 La-Ferté-Sous-Jouarre : 88.0 MHz
 Meaux : 88.8 MHz
 Melun : 88.0 MHz
 Nemours : 92.5 MHz
 Provins : 95.5 MHz

Seine Maritime
 Gournay-En-Bray : 106.2 MHz

Somme
 Abbeville : 94.4 MHz
 Amiens : 97.7 MHz
 Péronne : 103.4 MHz

Yvelines
 Mantes La Jolie : 101.7 MHz
 Rambouillet : 88.0

References

External links

Radio stations in France
Radio in Paris
Radio stations established in 1983